The 1969–70 FA Trophy was the first season of the FA Trophy. The competition was set up for non-league clubs which paid their players and were therefore not eligible to enter the FA Amateur Cup.

First Round Qualifying

Ties

Replays

2nd Replay

3rd Replay

Second Round Qualifying

Ties

Replays

2nd Replay

Third Round Qualifying

Ties

Replays

First round
The teams that given byes to this round are Cambridge United, Hillingdon Borough, Wimbledon, King's Lynn, Worcester City, Romford, Weymouth, Yeovil Town, Macclesfield Town, Wigan Athletic, Morecambe, Gainsborough Trinity, South Shields, Bangor City, Hyde United, Goole Town, Stafford Rangers, Great Harwood, Mossley, New Brighton, Kidderminster Harriers, Tamworth, Hednesford, Bromsgrove Rovers, Taunton Town, Bideford, Bridgwater Town, Glastonbury, Kirkby Town, Lancaster City and Burscough.

Ties

Replays

Second round

Ties

Replays

Third round

Ties

Replays

2nd Replay

Fourth round

Ties

Replays

Semi-finals

Ties

Final

External links
 RSSSF: England FA Trophy 1969-1970
 FCHD: FA Trophy 1969-70

1969–70 domestic association football cups
1969–70 in English football
1969-70